The McCoy Formation is a geologic formation in Colorado. It preserves fossils dating back to the Carboniferous period.

See also

 List of fossiliferous stratigraphic units in Colorado
 Paleontology in Colorado

References
 

Carboniferous Colorado
Carboniferous southern paleotropical deposits